Shapoval is a surname of Ukrainian-language origin. Derives from the name of the profession – a master who rolls or fulls hats. 

Notable people include:
Dmytro Shapoval (born 1996), Ukrainian footballer
Evhen Shapoval (born 1987), Ukrainian footballer
Maksym Shapoval (1978–2017), Ukrainian military officer
Mykola Shapoval (1886–1948), Ukrainian general
Oleksandr Shapoval (1975–2022), Ukrainian ballet dancer
Serhiy Shapoval (born 1990), Ukrainian footballer
Viktor Shapoval (born 1979), Ukrainian high jumper
Vladyslav Shapoval (born 1995), Ukrainian footballer

See also

 
 Shapovalov/Shapovalova

Ukrainian-language surnames
Occupational surnames